Scylla olivacea, commonly known as the orange mud crab, is a commercially important species of mangrove crab in the genus Scylla.  It is one of several crabs known as the mud crab and is found in mangrove areas from Southeast Asia to Pakistan, and from Japan to northern Australia. Along with other species in the genus Scylla, it is widely farmed in aquaculture using wild-caught stocks. They can be differentiated from other species of Scylla by having blunted spines on the dorsal distal corner of the palm (propodus) of the claw, and by the rounded frontal lobe spines with shallow separations in between the eyes.

References

Portunoidea
Crustaceans described in 1796